Desmodiastrum is a genus of flowering plants in the legume family, Fabaceae. It belongs to the subfamily Faboideae and is found in India.

References 

Desmodieae
Fabaceae genera